Kelishad-e Rokh (also Romanized as Kelīshād-e Rokh and Kelīshād Rokh) is a village in Zirkuh Rural District, Bagh-e Bahadoran District, Lenjan County, Isfahan Province, Iran. At the 2006 census, its population was 1,684, in 453 families.

References 

Populated places in Lenjan County